Davide Valsecchi (born 24 January 1987) is an Italian former racing driver and the 2012 GP2 Series champion.

Career

Formula Renault
Valsecchi drove in Renault-based series from 2003 to 2007, rising from Italian Formula Renault and the Formula Renault Eurocup to the more powerful cars of the World Series by Renault in 2006. He won one race in the categories during this period, in the WSR during the 2007 season.

Formula Three
From 2003 to 2005, Valsecchi also competed in selected Italian and German Formula Three races, scoring one podium finish in these three years.

Formula 3000
In 2005, Valsecchi drove one race in the 3000 Pro Series, a championship for old International Formula 3000 cars.

Sports car racing
In 2006, Valsecchi competed in three races of the Le Mans Series for the Barazi-Epsilon team in the LMP2 class of the championship, taking a podium finish in each race.

GP2 Series

For 2008, Valsecchi competed in both the GP2 Series and the new GP2 Asia Series for the Durango team, alongside Alberto Valerio. In qualifying for the second round of the GP2 Series at Istanbul, he crashed heavily at 175 mph, but escaped serious injury. However, he did not take part in the rest of the race meeting. Although the car was badly damaged in the crash, GP2 technical director Didier Perrin suspected a braking problem. Valsecchi's evacuation from the wreckage was also hampered by his crotch strap becoming wedged between the foam seat and the chassis, resulting in a technical bulletin being circulated amongst the GP2 teams with instructions on how to fit the strap correctly. Valsecchi suffered mild concussion and a spinal injury, and subsequently missed the next two rounds of the championship. His seat was taken first by compatriot Marcello Puglisi, and then by Ben Hanley. He returned to racing action for the race meeting at Silverstone, where he scored a point in the sprint race. He later crashed his car heavily during the feature race at Spa-Francorchamps, necessitating another visit to hospital, but this time he was uninjured and scored a point in the sprint race the next day. At Monza, Valsecchi won the sprint race, his first GP2 victory.

Valsecchi remained with Durango for the 2008–09 GP2 Asia Series season and the start of the 2009 GP2 Series season, where he was partnered by Carlos Iaconelli/Michael Dalle Stelle and Nelson Panciatici respectively. He also took part in the Renault Driver Development programme. In August 2009 he moved to the Barwa Addax team to replace Formula One-bound Romain Grosjean, alongside Vitaly Petrov. He finished the season in 17th place.

Valsecchi joined iSport International for the 2009–10 GP2 Asia Series season and for the 2010 GP2 Series season, where he was partnered by Oliver Turvey. Valsecchi won the Asian title, with three races to spare, after taking three wins and two second places in the first five races of the season. In the main series, he dropped behind Turvey, but scored his first pole position and won the final race of the season to take eighth in the drivers' championship, his best performance so far.

For 2011, Valsecchi signed for the new Team AirAsia alongside Luiz Razia, as part of both drivers' test drive deals with the Lotus Formula One team. He finished seventh in the Asia series, losing his championship to Romain Grosjean. In the main series, he took the team's first victory in the Monaco feature race, and also set his first fastest lap in the category. After another double points finish at Valencia, however, he failed to score in the remaining ten races, slipping back to eighth in the championship and equalling his previous year's result.

Valsecchi moved to the DAMS team—which had won the drivers' championship in 2011 with Grosjean—for the 2012 season, where he partnered Felipe Nasr. A strong performer from the start of the year, he established a championship lead by winning three out of the four races held in Bahrain. He lost ground mid-season to former team-mate and title rival Razia, who briefly took the championship initiative, but a strong end to the season, including a win at his home round of the championship at Monza, saw him retake the lead in the standings and ultimately win the drivers' championship with 247 points to Razia's total of 222.

Formula One

Valsecchi tested a Formula One car for the first time on 17 November 2010, at the  season-ending "young drivers" test in Abu Dhabi, with Hispania Racing. He set a best time of 1:43.013, two seconds faster than regular driver Bruno Senna's qualifying time for the Abu Dhabi Grand Prix set on the previous Saturday, although the track conditions had improved in the meantime. Hispania also tested fellow GP2 drivers Pastor Maldonado and Josef Král. He was linked to a reserve drive at Team Lotus for the 2011 season and was confirmed as a Lotus test driver in March of that year. He then drove in Friday practice during the Malaysian Grand Prix weekend in April 2011, replacing Heikki Kovalainen in the morning session.

Having won the 2012 GP2 Series title, Valsecchi aimed to move up into Formula One.

Valsecchi acted as testing and reserve driver for the Lotus F1 Team in 2013 driving for the team during media events. Prior to the 2013 US Grand Prix Lotus driver Kimi Räikkönen announced he would miss the final two races of the season needing emergency back surgery due to an old injury. As reserve driver Valsecchi was expected by many to take the drive. However, with its lucrative place in the constructors' championship on the line, Lotus opted to choose a more experienced driver to fill the position. Wild rumors circulated that drivers such as Michael Schumacher had been approached but ultimately former Caterham and McLaren driver Heikki Kovalainen was chosen to fill the seat. Valsecchi was publicly critical of the decision describing it as a "huge blow". Kovalainen finished the final two races in 14th place, failing to score any points for the Lotus F1 team. Valsecchi's public criticism of the team's decision, lack of large personal sponsorship and a desire to return to a racing position have been cited as reasons for his replacement as reserve driver with Caterham driver Charles Pic for 2014.

In 2014, Valsecchi drove in the GT Open series for Lamborghini.

Television

Valsecchi is a Sky Sport Formula Two analyst and Sky Sports F1 commentator since 2016 and Top Gear Italia presenter since 2016. Valsecchi has become known for his extremely excitable commentary style.

Racing record

Career summary

Complete Formula Renault 3.5 Series results
(key) (Races in bold indicate pole position) (Races in italics indicate fastest lap)

Complete GP2 Series results
(key) (Races in bold indicate pole position) (Races in italics indicate fastest lap)

Complete GP2 Asia Series results
(key) (Races in bold indicate pole position) (Races in italics indicate fastest lap)

Complete Formula One participations
(key) (Races in bold indicate pole position) (Races in italics indicate fastest lap)

Complete Blancpain GT Series Sprint Cup results

References

External links
 
 

1987 births
Living people
Sportspeople from the Province of Como
Italian racing drivers
Italian Formula Three Championship drivers
Italian Formula Renault 2.0 drivers
Formula Renault Eurocup drivers
German Formula Three Championship drivers
International Formula Master drivers
European Le Mans Series drivers
World Series Formula V8 3.5 drivers
GP2 Asia Series drivers
GP2 Asia Series champions
GP2 Series drivers
Auto GP drivers
GP2 Series Champions
International GT Open drivers
ISport International drivers
RP Motorsport drivers
Cram Competition drivers
Epsilon Euskadi drivers
Durango drivers
DAMS drivers
Caterham Racing drivers